Edward T. "Ed" Scott (born August 6, 1965) is an American politician. From 2004 to 2016 he served in the Virginia House of Delegates, representing the 30th district in the Virginia Piedmont, including Madison and Orange Counties, plus part of Culpeper County. He is a member of the Republican Party.

Electoral history

Notes

External links
 (campaign finance)

1965 births
Living people
Republican Party members of the Virginia House of Delegates
Virginia Tech alumni
People from Culpeper, Virginia
21st-century American politicians